The 2011–12 Wagner Seahawks men's basketball team represented Wagner College during the 2011–12 NCAA Division I men's basketball season. The Seahawks, led by second year head coach Dan Hurley, played their home games at Spiro Sports Center and are members of the Northeast Conference. They finished the season 25–6, 15–3 in NEC play to finish in second place. They lost in the semifinals of the NEC Basketball tournament to Robert Morris. Despite having 25 wins, the Seahawks did not accept an invitation to a post season tournament.

Roster

Schedule

|-
!colspan=9 style=|Regular season

|-
!colspan=9 style=| NEC tournament

Source

References

Wagner Seahawks men's basketball seasons
Wagner